Cấm Sơn Lake is a lake in Lục Ngạn District, Bắc Giang Province, Vietnam, near the border with Lạng Sơn Province. The lake lies off Highway 279, northeast of the city of Bắc Giang.

Lakes of Vietnam
Landforms of Bắc Giang province